TNT Express was an international courier delivery services company with its headquarters in Hoofddorp, Netherlands.

History
The namesake Thomas Nationwide Transport grandfather company was originally started in 1946 with a single truck in Adelaide, South Australia. 

On 26 May 2011, TNT Express separated from its parent company, TNT NV, being listing on the Euronext Amsterdam. TNT NV subsequently renamed itself PostNL.

However, the deal fell through in January 2013, after it was announced that UPS had failed to obtain permission from the European Commission, and as such, had been blocked on competition grounds.

The European Commission launched an investigation into the planned acquisition and on 8 January 2016, approved the deal. The transaction was complete 25 May 2016.

In August 2017, TNT Express was badly affected by the NotPetya cyber attack, partly because some operations and communication systems were based in Ukraine, where the cyber attack originated. TNT had to operate using manual processes for months creating very large backlogs. Some records were entirely lost.

On 1 December 2021, FedEx announced that the fusion was completed and that TNT Express is now a trading name of FedEx.

Operations

TNT offered road and air delivery services in Europe, the Asia Pacific region, the Americas, the Middle East, and Africa. In June 2014, TNT conducted a rail freight trial assessing improving support to businesses in the United Kingdom, and cutting carbon emissions.

References

External links

Express mail
FedEx
Logistics companies of the Netherlands
Dutch companies established in 2011
Transport companies established in 2011
2016 mergers and acquisitions
Defunct companies of the Netherlands
Companies based in North Holland
Haarlemmermeer